Pseudotoglossa is a genus of beetles in the family Carabidae, containing the following species:

 Pseudotoglossa coelestina (Bates, 1878)
 Pseudotoglossa inaequalis (Chaudoir, 1872)
 Pseudotoglossa marginella (Bates, 1883)
 Pseudotoglossa obscurella (Bates, 1878)
 Pseudotoglossa rufitarsis (Chaudoir, 1877)
 Pseudotoglossa semilaevis (Chaudoir, 1872)
 Pseudotoglossa terminalis (Chaudoir, 1872)

References

Lebiinae